Buist Lamb "Buss" Warren (1916–1986) was an American football player who played one season in the National Football League (NFL) in 1945. He coached high school football many years.

Playing career
Warren attended the University of Tennessee, leading the Vols to the 1941 Sugar Bowl.

In 1945, he played for the Philadelphia Eagles and the Pittsburgh Steelers in his only season in the NFL. During World War II he served in the Navy as a chef, and in college he played in the Orange Bowl in 1939.

References

1916 births
1986 deaths
American football quarterbacks
Great Lakes Navy Bluejackets football players
Philadelphia Eagles players
Pittsburgh Steelers players
Tennessee Volunteers football players
United States Navy personnel of World War II
Sportspeople from Provo, Utah
Players of American football from Utah
People from Valencia, Santa Clarita, California
United States Navy sailors